Muhi is a village in Borsod-Abaúj-Zemplén County, Hungary.

The area has been inhabited since prehistoric times. In the thirteenth century, two villages stood here. In the Battle of Mohi, which took place here in April 1241, the Mongols led by Batu Khan decisively defeated the forces of King Béla IV of Hungary.

External links 
 Street map 

Populated places in Borsod-Abaúj-Zemplén County